Vladimir Isakov (born 25 February 1987, Tula, Russia) is a Russian political figure and a member of the 8th State Duma.
 
In 2007, he joined the Russian Communist Youth League and in 2008, he became a member of the Communist Party of the Russian Federation. In 2009, he worked on various projects related to youth politics of the Central Committee of the Communist Party of the Russian Federation. From 2012 to 2014, he served as deputy of the Assembly of deputies Kurkino. On September 14, 2014, he was elected deputy of the Tula City Duma of the 5th convocation. In 2019, he was re-elected for the Tula City Duma of the 6th convocation. Since September 2021, he has served as deputy of the 8th State Duma.

References
 

 

1987 births
Living people
Communist Party of the Russian Federation members
21st-century Russian politicians
Eighth convocation members of the State Duma (Russian Federation)
People from Tula, Russia